MTV Extra was a music channel by MTV Networks Europe, the channel first launched on 1 July 1999 on the Sky Digital platform, and was a mixture of music videos and repeats of MTV Programming. Towards the end of the channel's life, programming was dropped and the channel showed solely music videos (under the "Pure Music" name), with MTV Dance in the evenings. MTV Dance was spun off into its own channel on 20 April 2001, and MTV Extra was renamed MTV Hits! (now MTV Hits) at 6am on 1 May 2001. MTV Extra is notable for being the only spin-off MTV channel to use the same song title graphics as its parent channel (although it had its own separate idents).

In 2005, Viacom proposed two channels to the Conseil supérieur de l'audiovisuel to obtain a licence to air in the French free digital terrestrial television: Nickelodeon and MTV Extra. Viacom didn't find a French partner and the CSA preferred French groups projects.

References

MTV channels
Defunct television channels in the United Kingdom
Television channels and stations established in 1999
Television channels and stations disestablished in 2001
1999 establishments in the United Kingdom